Henri Bounameaux is a known clinical faculty and Professor of Medicine (hon), specialized in internal and vascular medicine (angiology), and general medicine.

Professor Bounameaux served as the Dean of Faculty of medicine at the University of Geneva, Switzerland. Presently, Professor Bounameaux is a distinguished professor of the University of Geneva and the President of the Swiss Academy of Medical Sciences (SAMS).

Professor Bounameaux has authored numerous research papers and several review papers. His research interests cover all aspects related to the prevention, diagnosis, and treatment of venous thromboembolism.  His main contribution to the field relates to the non-invasive work-up of suspected pulmonary embolism, particularly the use of fibrin D-dimer. He was among the first scientists in the late eighties to suggest that this dosage in the patient plasma allowed to safely rule out venous thromboembolism, which was demonstrated in subsequent publications of the Geneva research group. He was among the first scientists in the late eighties to suggest that this dosage in the patient plasma allowed to safely rule out venous thromboembolism, which was demonstrated in the subsequent publications of the Geneva research group.

Early life and education 
Henri Bounameaux completed his primary and secondary education at Lubumbashi (Belgian Congo, Zaïre) and Baccalaureate type C from St.-Louis, France in 1971.

He received his medical degree and post-graduate specialization from the Faculty of medicine, University of Basel, and is board-certified in internal and vascular medicine (angiology). He completed the post-doctoral education from Center for Thrombosis and Vascular Research, Belgium.

He is now an emeritus professor of the University of Geneva.

Research 
Professor Bounameaux research interests are broad and include studies on Non-invasive vascular diagnosis, venous thromboembolism and pulmonary embolism & Cardiology, Angiology, Hemostasis. His main contribution to the field relates to the non-invasive work-up of suspected pulmonary embolism, particularly the use of fibrin D-dimer. He was among the first scientists in the late eighties to suggest that this dosage in the patient plasma allowed to safely rule out venous thromboembolism, which was demonstrated in subsequent publications of the Geneva research group.

Awards 
During his career, Professor Bounameaux has received the following awards and honors:

 Theodor-Naegeli International Thrombosis Award 
 President of the Swiss Society of Angiology 
 Président of the Société d’Angiologie de Langue Française
 Chairman of the ISTH Council
 Distinguished Career Award from ISTH 
Honorary member of the Swiss Society of Angiology

Publications

 Measurement of D-Dimer in plasma as diagnostic aid in suspected pulmonary embolism.
 Diagnosis of pulmonary embolism by a noninvasive decision analysis-based strategy including clinical probability, D-Dime levels, and ultrasonography: A management study
 Factor V Leiden paradox: risk of deep vein thrombosis but not of pulmonary embolism.
 Multidetector-row computed tomography in suspected pulmonary embolism.
D-dimer for venous thromboembolism diagnosis: Twenty years later.
Oral rivaroxaban for the treatment of symptomatic pulmonary embolism.

References

External links 
 Henri Bounameaux on Google Scholar.
 Henri Bounameaux on Scopus.

Living people
Academic staff of the University of Basel
Academic staff of the University of Geneva
Year of birth missing (living people)